Rajiv Gandhi University of Knowledge Technologies, Nuzvid (RGUKT) was founded as a State University by an act of the Legislature by AP Government as a full-fledged university in 2008, having a university campus located at Nuzvid, Krishna District, Andhra Pradesh, India.

The primary objective of establishing RGUKT was to provide high quality educational opportunities for the aimed rural youth of Andhra Pradesh.

Academics
The institute offers six-year Bachelor of Technology after 10th class examinations which includes two years pre-university course equivalent to intermediate degree followed by four year degree course in engineering course. It also offers postgraduate Master of Technology courses.

Affiliation 
The university comes under autonomous Institutions specialized in teaching and research sector in Information Technology and Engineering. RGUKT Nuzvid is approved by AICTE and the institution follows the norms and regulations of Government of India, University Grants Commission (UGC) India.

Departments

 Computer Science and Engineering
 Electronics and Communication Engineering
 Electrical Engineering
 Mechanical Engineering
 Civil Engineering
 Chemical Engineering
 Metallurgical and Materials Engineering
 Mathematics
 Physics
 Chemistry
 Telugu
 IT

Culture and activities
The institute conducts various extra academic activities such as arts, vocal music, Kuchipudi dance, mridangam and yoga.

References

2008 establishments in Andhra Pradesh
Educational institutions established in 2008